Meles (fl. 8th century BC; also known as Myrsus) was a semi-historical king of Lydia. According to Herodotus, he was the 21st and penultimate king of the Heraclid dynasty and was succeeded by his son, Candaules (died c.687 BC).

See also
 List of kings of Lydia

References

Sources
 
 

Kings of Lydia
8th-century BC deaths
Year of birth unknown
8th-century BC rulers